Dale Eldred (November 9, 1933 in Minneapolis, Minnesota – July 26, 1993 in Kansas City, Missouri) was an internationally acclaimed sculptor renowned for large-scale sculptures that emphasized both natural and generated light.

Biography
The grandson of Finnish immigrant builders, Eldred was raised in Minnesota. Eldred moved to Kansas City in 1959, fresh out of the University of Michigan. Within a year, he was named chairman of the sculpture department of Kansas City Art Institute.

Eldred possessed an imposing physical presence and was a college football fullback. He was known to be resilient in the face of challenge, such as the fire in 1991 that destroyed a studio that contained his library and many valuable artworks.

Eldred chaired the sculpture department at KCAI for 33 years, exerting a powerful influence on thousands of students, including: James Clover, Gary Freeman, Shawn Brixey, Ming Fay, Michael Rees, John E. Buck, and the collaborative couple, (the late) Kate Ericson and Mel Ziegler who met at KCAI. He also was the artistic director of Biosphere II, and was a fellow at the Massachusetts Institute of Technology Center for Advanced Visual Studies.

Dale Eldred was a victim of the "500-year" flood in the summer of 1993, when the Missouri River inundated parts of Kansas City. He died in a fall while trying to rescue equipment in his West Bottoms-neighborhood studio.

Sculpture
Eldred's early sculptures were large works in clay. Influenced by the monumental steel sculptures of David Smith and Alexander Calder, he began to work in steel, wood and other materials, creating large sculptures and environments. Examples of these include a sculpture composed of a pair of large cantilevered slabs of wood and steel, placed near the entrance of the Kansas City Art Institute; and a park in northern Kansas City, Missouri housing a large stone and lumber environment. His work of this time was reviewed favorably by critic and artist Donald Judd.

Eldred was commissioned to redesign downtown Kansas City, Kansas. His challenging modernist design included futuristic fountains, irregular streets, and steel curbs. Received poorly, its unpopularity led the city to modify much of his work, but aspects still exist today.

Eldred expressed his desire to reveal natural phenomena. He created a towering sculpture in a Kansas City park that sprayed water in order to create prismatic light refractions. His emphasis increasingly focused on light; he used mirrors, pure pigments, gas flames, fluorescent paint, refraction tape, glass, neon tubes and other materials to create light effects. "I want the sculptures to remind us all," he said, "that our lives are inextricably linked to light, and that our universe is in constant motion." He created the Light+Time Tower at the city of Raleigh, North Carolina designed to diffract the morning and afternoon sunlight into vibrant colors visible to the commuters who pass by it. His Steeple of Light, originally proposed by Frank Lloyd Wright for the Community Christian Church in Kansas City, was completed by his partner and collaborator Roberta Lord after Eldred died in 1993 before the sculpture was finalized in 1994.

In collaboration with choreographer Todd Bolender, he created the set and costumes for "Voyager," a ballet performed by the State Ballet of Missouri.

He collaborated with other highly regarded artists and musicians, including composer Philip Glass.

Commissions, Museums and Private Collections

United States
Arizona
 Time/Light Fusion, 1990, Scottsdale Center for the Arts, Scottsdale
 Time Garden, 1990, Arizona State University, Tempe
 Vision Lens: Light and Future, 1990, Arizona State University, Tempe

Colorado
 Light & Time Labyrinth, 1994 (installed), Auraria Higher Education Center, Denver

Florida
 Solar Time Plane, 1984, Broward County Main Library, Fort Lauderdale
 Light Abacus I, 1990, Criser Hall, Gainesville
 Sun Stations, 1983, Coconut Grove Station, Miami
 Earth and Sky Garden, 1984, University of South Florida, College of Public Health courtyard, Tampa
 "Spectral Field", 1990, University of Central Florida, College of Engineering, Orlando

Illinois
 Urban Time and Light Field, 1985, Cermak Plaza Shopping Center, Berwyn

Iowa
 Landscape Piece #1, 1965, Des Moines Art Center, Des Moines
 Model for Landscape, 1967, Des Moines Art Center, Des Moines

Kansas
 Salina Piece, 1969, University of Kansas, Lawrence
 Untitled, 1968, litho, Spencer Gallery of Art, University of Kansas, Lawrence
 Untitled, 1968, litho, Spencer Gallery of Art, University of Kansas, Lawrence
 Galileo's Garden, 1984, Johnson County Community College, Overland Park

Michigan
 Untitled, 1973, Grand Valley State University, Allendale

Minnesota
 Mankato Piece, 1968, Riverfront Park, Mankato
 Minneapolis Project, 1983, Minneapolis Institute of Arts and other sites, Minneapolis

Missouri
 Heritage Fountain, 1977, Blue Valley Park, Kansas City
 Steeple of Light, 1990–94, Community Christian Church, Kansas City
 Signage, Harry J. Epstein Hardware, Kansas City
 East Gate Piece, 1966, Kansas City Art Institute, Kansas City
 Homage to the Ancients, 1975, print, Kemper Museum of Contemporary Art, Kansas City
 Seven Views of the Grand Canyon, 1985, Kemper Museum of Contemporary Art, Kansas City
 Sculpture II, 1963, Nelson-Atkins Museum of Art, Kansas City
 Standing Iron, 1962, Nelson-Atkins Museum of Art, Kansas City
 Untitled, 1962, University of Missouri-Kansas City, Kansas City
 Sun Field, 1991, Laumeier Sculpture Park, St. Louis

North Carolina
 Time + Light Tower, 1991, Capital Blvd & Fairview Dr, Raleigh

Ohio
 Light Path Crossing, 1987, Case Western University, Cleveland
 Sun Obelisk, 1974, Promenade Park, Toledo

Oklahoma
 Tulsa Time and Light Continuum, 1983, Convention Center, Tulsa
 Radiant Range, 1993, Convention Center, Tulsa
 Kansas Landmark (Drum Piece), 1965, Philbrook Museum of Art, Tulsa

Oregon
 Levitated Light, 1987, Portland State University, School of Business Administration, Portland

Tennessee
 Airport Sun Project, 1989, Nashville International Airport, Nashville

Utah
 Light and Time Incident, 1995, Utah State University, Science / Technology Library, Logan

Virginia
 Light Garden, 1988, Virginia Beach

Wisconsin

 Appleton Aurora, 1989, Appleton Center, Appleton

International
 City Art Museum, Helsinki (Finland)
 Cankaya Cultural and Arts Foundation, Ankara, Turkey

Awards and honors
He received numerous awards and honors, including a Guggenheim Fellowship and grants from the Ford Foundation, the American Institute of Architects and the National Endowment of the Arts.

Publications
Ralph Coe. Dale Eldred: Sculpture Into Environment, Regents Press Kansas, 1978.

References

External links
 Roberta Lord, The Sky Above Dale Eldred
 Biography: Kansas City Public Library
 Homage to Dale Eldred, Jürgen Claus Leonardo, Vol.28, No.4 (1995), pp.328-329, Published by: The MIT Press
 New York Times, Wednesday, July 28, 1993
 Kansas City Missouri, Office of the City Clerk, Legislation #930908, 8/5/1993, Special Action Resolution, Councilmember Shields: On The Death of Dale Eldred

1933 births
1993 deaths
Artists from Minneapolis
Minimalist artists
Light artists
Kansas City Art Institute alumni
Michigan Wolverines football players
20th-century American sculptors
American male sculptors
20th-century American architects
American people of Finnish descent
Accidental deaths from falls
Accidental deaths in Missouri
Sculptors from Minnesota
Natural disaster deaths in the United States
20th-century American male artists